WOWZ-FM is a classic country formatted broadcast radio station licensed to Accomac, Virginia, serving the Eastern Shore of Virginia. WOWZ-FM is owned and operated by The Marks Group.

Programming
On November 28, 2017, the then-WVES changed their format to classic country, branded as "Wow 99.3 & 101.1" (simulcast with WICO-FM 101.1 FM Snow Hill, MD). On December 12, 2017, WVES swapped their call letters with WOWZ-FM to go with the "Wow" branding.

References

External links
99-3 Shore Country on Facebook

OWZ-FM
Country radio stations in the United States
Radio stations established in 1990
1990 establishments in Virginia